Durfee may refer to 
Places in the United States
B.M.C. Durfee High School in Fall River, Massachusetts
B.M.C. Durfee High School (1886 building) in Fall River, Massachusetts
Bradford Durfee College of Technology in Fall River, Massachusetts
Durfee Creek in Cook County, Minnesota
Durfee Hall, a residential dormitory of Yale University
Durfee House, a historic building in Geneva, New York
Durfee Mills, a historic mill complex in Fall River, Massachusetts
Greene–Durfee House, a historic house in Warwick, Rhode Island 
Henry E. Durfee Farmhouse in Southbridge, Massachusetts 
Lafayette–Durfee House in Fall River, Massachusetts
Mike Durfee State Prison in South Dakota
Ramsay-Durfee Estatein Los Angeles, California

Others
Durfee (surname)
Durfee square, an attribute of an integer partition in mathematics